Minacraga plata is a moth in the family Dalceridae. It was described by S.E. Miller in 1994. It is found in Costa Rica and Panama. The habitat consists of tropical moist, tropical premontane wet and tropical premontane moist forests.

References

Moths described in 1994
Dalceridae